Nancy Falik Cott (born November 8, 1945) is an American historian and professor who has taught at Yale and Harvard universities, specializing in gender topics in the United States in the 19th and 20th centuries. She has testified on same-sex marriage in several US states.

Early years

Nancy F. Cott was born in Philadelphia, Pennsylvania on November 8, 1945. Her father was a textile manufacturer and her family origins are Austro-Hungarian Jewish.  She attended public schools in Cheltenham Township, Pennsylvania. She studied at Cornell University, obtaining a bachelor's degree in 1967, then went on to Brandeis University where she obtained an master's degree in American civilization in 1969. She married Leland D. Cott in 1969. They have two children, born in 1974 and 1979. She obtained her doctorates in American civilization from Brandeis in 1974.

Career
Cott became a lecturer at Boston Public Library, then in 1975 was appointed to teach history and American studies at Yale University.
Cott was assistant professor 1975–79, associate professor 1979–86 and professor 1986–90. She obtained research fellowships from the Rockefeller Foundation and Guggenheim Foundation and from the National Endowment for the Humanities. Cott was one of the founders of the Women's Studies program at Yale. She chaired the American Studies Program at Yale in the mid-1990s, and then directed the Division of the Humanities. In 1990 she was appointed Stanley Woodward Professor of History and American Studies.

Cott was named Sterling Professor of History and American Studies in 2001 at Yale University. At the invitation of  Drew Gilpin Faust of the Radcliffe Institute for Advanced Study she accepted a position as Carl and Lily Pforzheimer Foundation Director of the Schlesinger Library in 2001. She had a long association with the library, having used it to research her first book, Root of Bitterness: Documents of the Social History of American Women (1972). Cott was elected a member of the American Academy of Arts and Sciences in 2008. She left the Schlesinger Library in June 2014. As of 2014 Cott was Jonathan Trumbull Professor of American History at Harvard University. She was teaching undergraduate courses on the history of sexuality and gender, and graduate-level courses on the history of the US in the 20th century. In 2014 she was also president-elect of the Organization of American Historians.

Same-sex marriage

Cott has helped write amicus curiae briefs on same-sex marriage in several states since 1999.
These have included challenges to the federal Defense of Marriage Act. Cott testified as an expert witness in the case of Perry v. Schwarzenegger in California. Cott has pointed out that the Christian tradition of monogamous marriage only dates back to the time of Christ, and was not strongly enforced by Catholic ecclesiastical law until 1400 or 1500. Protestants, including the founders of the US, have historically seen marriage as a civil concern, mainly concerning child support. Views on marriage continue to change, with higher divorce rates, different views on the role of marriage and the legalization of interracial marriage.

Cott says she has come to favor same-sex marriages, "as a result of my historical research and study." In her view, "if gender symmetry and equality and the couples' own definition of spousal roles are characteristic of marriage, then same-sex couples seem perfectly able to fulfill those roles." When testifying in January 2010 in the challenge to California Proposition 8 (2008), which banned same sex marriage, she was asked to comment on the defense assertion that "the purpose of the institution of marriage, the central purpose, is to promote procreation and to channel naturally procreative sexual activity between men and women into stable and enduring unions." She responded that, "It rather reminded me of the story about the seven blind men and the elephant, in that each of them is feeling the animal at some side of it; and the one that feels the trunk says, oh, this animal is just like a snake."

Publications
Publications include:

References

Citations

Sources 

 
 

 
 

1945 births
20th-century American historians
21st-century American historians
American women historians
Brandeis University alumni
Cornell University alumni
Harvard University faculty
Historians from Pennsylvania
Living people
Yale University faculty
Yale Sterling Professors
People from Philadelphia
21st-century American women